is a city in Kyoto Prefecture, Japan. , the city had an estimated population of 87,518 in 29,676 households and a population density of 390 persons per km².

Geography
Kameoka abuts Kyoto to the east and is located to the north of Osaka. It is on the border line between former Tanba and Yamashiro Provinces.  Together with Nantan city, the region is known as Southern Tanba, Kuchitan or Nanatan. For centuries, Kameoka served as a key transportation point to connect San'in region and Tanba providence with Kyoto.  Today, the city serves as one of the suburbs of Metro Kyoto.

Kameoka is notable as the launch point for Hozugawa Kudari, a boat ride down the Hozu River. It is also the location of Anaoji Temple, one of the 21 temples in western Japan authorized to issue amulets in the name of the Boddhisattva Kannon.

Neighbouring municipalities 
Kyoto Prefecture
 Kyoto
 Nantan
Osaka Prefecture
 Ibaraki
 Takatsuki
 Nose
 Toyono

Climate
Kameoka has a Humid subtropical climate (Köppen Cfa) characterized by warm summers and cool winters with light to no snowfall.  The average annual temperature in Kameoka is 13.5 °C. The average annual rainfall is 1690 mm with September as the wettest month. The temperatures are highest on average in August, at around 25.4 °C, and lowest in January, at around 2.1 °C.

Demographics
Per Japanese census data, the population of Kameoka peaked around the year 2000 and has declined slightly since.

History 
Kameoka was part of ancient Tanba Province. Rice cultivation was introduced in the Yayoi period,a nd the area's many large kofun burial mounds, especially on the left bank of the Oigawa River (Hozu River). According to the Nihon Shoki, at the beginning of the 6th century, the area was the center of a succession struggle within the imperial court, in which King Yahiko, who was in the direct line of succession was defeated by Emperor Keitai from Echizen Province. The area was the location of the ichinomiya of the province, Izumo-daijingū and the Tanba Kokubun-ji. The Tanba provincial capital was located nearby, but its exact location has yet to be determined. The area around Kameoka developed as transportation hub as it was the entrance to Kyoto from the San'in region. In 1333, Takauji Ashikaga raised his army in Kameoka to settle the Genkō Rebellion in Kyoto. In the Sengoku period, Akechi Mitsuhide constructed Tamba|Kameyama Castle and laid out the castle town which became the core of modern Kameyama. During the Edo period, it was the center of Tanba-Kameyama Domain, which was controlled by a succession of fudai daimyo clans. Kameyama was renamed Kameoka in 1869 to avoid confusion with Kameyama, Mie. The town of Kameyama was established with the creation of the modern municipalities system on April 1, 1889. On January 1, 1955, Kameoka merged with 15 neighboring villages all within Minami-Kuwada District, and was raised to city status.

Government
Kameoka has a mayor-council form of government with a directly elected mayor and a unicameral town council of 24 members. Kameoka contributes two members to the Kyoto Prefectural Assembly. In terms of national politics, the city is part of Kyoto 4th district of the lower house of the Diet of Japan.

Economy
Historically, the area served as a farming community for Kyoto, Japan's former capital.  For centuries, area farmers provided ingredients used for traditional Japanese food served in Kyoto including chestnuts, black beans, azuki, rice, matsutake, yams, and daikon. In addition, farmers in the city provide beef, chicken and ayu (also known as sweetfish). At present, the area is a mix of agriculture, light manufacturing and is increasingly a commuter town for Kyoto.

Education 
 Kyoto Gakuen University

Primary and secondary schools
Kameoka has 17 public elementary schools and seven public middle schools operated by the city government and two public high schools operated by the Kyoto Prefectural Department of Education.

Transportation

Railway
 JR West – San'in Main Line / [[Sagano Line)
 -  -  -  -

Highway

Sister cities 
Kameoka has agreements of friendship and co-operation with:
 Knittelfeld, Austria - April 14, 1964
 Stillwater, Oklahoma, USA - November 3, 1985
 Jandira, Brazil - November 3, 1980
 Suzhou, China - December 31, 1996

Local attractions
Tamba|Kameyama Castle ruins
Izumo-daijingū Shinto shrine
Anao-ji temple, 21st on the Saigoku Kannon Pilgrimage
Tanba Kokubun-ji ruins, National Historic Site
Chitose Kurumazuka Kofun, National Historic Site

Sports 
 – home of Kyoto Sanga FC, a professional football club

Notable people from Kameoka 
Maruyama Ōkyo
Aya Domenig

See also
2007 Kameoka mayoral election

References

External links

 Kameoka City official website 
 Kameoka City official website 

 
Cities in Kyoto Prefecture